Oxford Turnpike may refer to:
Oxford Turnpike (Connecticut)
Oxford Turnpike (New York)